Eveline Pauline "Queenie" Paul (OAM) (30 December 1893  – 31 July 1982) was an Australian performer in vaudeville shows (singer and dancer) and a theatre producer, active from the 1910s until the early 1980s. She was particularly known for her associations with the company's of J.C. Williamson and Sir Benjamin Fuller

Early life
Eveline Pauline Paul was born in Sydney, the daughter of Frederick William Paul and Antoinette Schuller Paul. Her father was born in Germany; her mother was French. Her nickname came from being the first girl in the family after four sons; she was "the little queen" from a young age.

Career
Queenie Paul was on stage with J.C. Williamson as a chorus girl by age 15. In her early 20s she was "principal boy" in a production of a pantomime, The Bunyip. In 1917 she co-starred with an American actor at the National Theatre; she and Mike Connors were soon wed, and worked in shows together for most of the next twelve years. Their "Con-Paul Theatre" company opened in 1931, with them headlining a variety show. In 1932, she was "ballet mistress and star" at the Sydney Theatre Royal. The Connors took a touring company to New Zealand in the mid-1930s. Apart from Connors, who was busy with a new broadcasting career, Paul concentrated on producing shows featuring her chorus line, the "Sun-Kissed Girls".

Honours
Paul's stylish wardrobe was often remarked upon and reported about. Later in life, she continued performing in variety shows, and she was a regular guest on television talk shows. In 1977 she was the guest of honor on an episode of This is Your Life. In 1982, she was awarded an Order of Australia medal (OAM).

Personal life
Paul married her co-star Mike Connors in 1917. They had three children, Celestine, Colleen, and Paul; Colleen died in 1933. Paul was widowed when Connors died in 1949.  She married again in 1960, to Walter John Harding, an accountant. Her great-nephews were Anthony Field of The Cockroaches and The Wiggles, and John Field and Paul Field, also of The Cockroaches.  Queenie Paul died in July 1982, just two days after her last performance, at the age of 88 years, in her home in Dulwich Hill. Her papers are archived in the Performing Arts Collection at Arts Centre Melbourne.

References

External links
Queenie Paul's listing at AusStage.
Sheet music for "A Smile for Ev'ry Day", written and composed by Queenie Paul and Harry Mashman, circa 1923.

1893 births
1982 deaths
20th-century Australian women singers
Australian female dancers